Lee Hyo-jin (born 22 April 1994) is a South Korean handball player for SK Sugar Gliders and the South Korean national team.

References

1994 births
Living people
South Korean female handball players
Handball players at the 2018 Asian Games
Asian Games gold medalists for South Korea
Asian Games medalists in handball
Medalists at the 2018 Asian Games